Shalom Hanoch  (born September 1, 1946) is an Israeli rock singer, lyricist and composer.

He is considered to be the father of Israeli rock and modern Israeli music in general, both of which have been profoundly influenced by his work. His collaboration with Arik Einstein produced some of the first Israeli rock albums. He is often referred to as "The King of Israeli Rock".

Biography
Shalom Hanoch was born in Kibbutz Mishmarot in 1946, roughly 16 months before the establishment of the state of Israel. His musical talent as a child was recognized in the kibbutz. Before discovering rock music, he listened to a wide variety of genres (from Classical, through Russian folk music, Gospel, and Blues).

After getting his first jazz guitar when he was around 12 years old, Hanoch began composing his own songs. By the age of 14, he had completed his first song, Laila (Night). He continued writing music withanother member of the Kibbutz, Meir Ariel, and joined the Kibbutz's band, HaMishmaron. Songs from that time include Agadat Deshe (Grass Legend), Nisa LaYam (We'll Go To The Beach), Risim (Eyelashes) and Yom Acharon (Last Day). At age 16, he took acting classes at Beit Tzvi arts school.

Nahal Army Troupe
Although at that point he was more interested in acting than in creating music, Hanoch was recruited by the Nahal army troupe when he turned 18, and wrote a few songs for the troupe while in the service. He was demobilized in 1968, but not before he had participated in a recording of the best-of album made of re-recorded versions to 1950s and 1960s hits by the troupe called Kol HaKavod LaNahal (Well Done, Nahal). In this album Hanoch sang Mitria Bishnaim along with the troupe's star, Shula Chen. The two were mentioned on the cover, an innovation for army band recordings.

Pre-Rock
In 1967 Shalom performed with the High Windows club in Tel Aviv. It was there that he was introduced to Arik Einstein, who was already a star in Israel. Impressed with what he had seen and heard, Einstein suggested that Hanoch write songs for him. A first EP, Hagar, was released the same year, with four of Hanoch's compositions performed by Einstein.

Hanoch's breakthrough occurred in 1968 when Arik Einstein recorded his second album, Mazal Gdi (Capricorn), that contained only songs written by Hanoch. He also wrote the lyrics for six of them. The cooperation between the two continued in the Israel Song Festival (Festival HaZemer), where Einstein performed Hanoch's songs. But the complex, unusual song "Prague," which dealt with the Soviet invasion of the capital of the Czech Republic, was not well-received by the audience. In 1969 Hanoch and his former Nahal-band member, Chanan Yovel, joined with Benny Amdursky and founded the band HaShlosharim. Shalom composed many of the band's songs. In these years he also wrote a lot of songs for other artists.

Rock Revolution
In 1970 Arik Einstein, Shalom Hanoch and The Churchills created a new Israeli sound, influenced by Anglo-American Rock n' Roll. The album Shablul, in which Hanoch composed all the songs, pioneered this new sound. One of the best-known songs from this album was Ma Ata Ose KsheAta Kam Baboker (What Do You Do When You Wake Up in the Morning). The Churchills, who played on most of the songs, was a band influenced by the Psychedelic rock of the late 1960s, and this kind of psychedelia appeared in some of their songs. Shablul's lyrics were another expression of musical innovation and changes in Israeli music. The words were written in popular rather than  official and formal language, as were used in Israeli songs before. Along with the extraordinary lyrics, one old-style song was in the album  HaBalada Al Yoel Moshe Salomon (The Ballad About Yoel Moshe Salomon).

Plastelina, the second Einstein-Hanoch album, was recorded four months after the first. Two more artists who worked with Einstein that time, Shmulik Kraus and Josie Katz, took part in recording and composing. In the same year Hanoch wrote and composed a song for Uri Zohar's Hitromemut movie. In 1971 Hanoch flew to London in order to start an international career.

International career
In London Shalom signed a contract with producer and music publisher Dick James, who worked with Elton John that time. In 1971 Hanoch recorded a solo album in English, Shalom. The album was recorded and produced by James' record company, DJM, with Elton John's backing band. The record included songs that were composed by Hanoch in Israel and were translated to English, and also included new compositions. A few of these became more famous in Israel several years later, when they were translated into Hebrew and appeared in his solo albums, and in an album by his new band Tamouz. With his return to Israel in 1973 Hanoch claimed he had come back because it was hard for him to succeed in other countries, and writing in English did not suit him. In 1976 the album was released in Israel by CBS and sold out in stores very fast. CBS never produced additional copies of the album, and it was never re-released.

Back in Israel

In 1973 Hanoch returned to Israel. He and Ariel Zilber founded the group Tamouz. With them leading the band, Tamouz became the most significant rock band of the late 1970s in Israel. Tamouz's only album – Sof Onat HaTapuzim (End of the Orange Season)(1976), was a milestone in the development of Israeli Rock, and became the preeminent album of its time. Tamouz went on a performance tour which was very successful. However, the tour's production costs were high and the band lost money. The group embarked on a last, successful tour which recouped some of its losses. However, it then disbanded due to its poor finances and Zilber's dissatisfaction with the band's musical type and genre. Tamouz reunited for a few tours in 1983, and also performed in the memory of Meir Ariel in 2000, a year after his death.

Adam Betoch Azmo
After Tamouz disbanded, Hanoch released his first Hebrew solo album – Adam Betoch Azmo (1977, A Man Inside Himself). The songs were mainly quiet and in minor keys, including Adam Betoch Azmo, Ir Zara (Foreign Town), Tiyul LeYafo (A Trip to Jaffa), and Rack Lirkod (Just Dance). Most of these songs talked about Hanoch's life, after a bitter divorce from his wife. In 1978 Hanoch performed in the Neviot Festival. The performances there were very successful, and made Hanoch an esteemed rock singer. At this time, Hanoch recorded his song – Haya Kedai (It Was Worth It), which was a huge success.

In 1979, Arik Einstein and Shalom Hanoch started an elaborately produced joint tour. The performance was recorded in Heichal HaTarbut and was released as Arik Einstein VeShalom Hanoch BeHofa'a Meshutefet. This album contained new songs of both Einstein and Hanoch, and two medleys (almost 20 minutes long each) of their best songs from their albums in the 1970s.

In 1980 Hanoch produced Einstein's MiShirei Sasha Argov. In the same year he also wrote and composed Shir Lelo Shem for Yehudit Ravitz, which was written in memory of Shalom's nephew, Avshalom, in November. Hanoch also composed a few songs for Einstein's album Hamush BeMishkafaim (Armed with Glasses), and composed Nurit Galron's very well known song – Ki HaAdam Etz HaSade.

White Wedding
In 1981 Hanoch created one of his most prominent albums – Chatuna Levana (White Wedding). This album differed from Hanoch's previous albums, since it was very dark sounding, and it was the first time Hanoch sang in his familiar voice of today, and not in a tenor as at the start of his career. The songs were very complex, and dealt with Hanoch's divorce, relationships, money and success. The album did not achieve commercial success for the first several years after its release,  but today it is recognized as a modern, heavy and rough rock creation in Hebrew.

The 1980s
In 1983 Hanoch recorded the album Al Pnei HaAdama (On the Face of the Earth) about man and nature. The album contained three new songs, and re-recordings of older songs. In 1985 he recorded his most successful album – Mehakim LeMashiach (Waiting for The Messiah). The album contained political-social songs: "Waiting for The Messiah" dealt with the crash of the Israeli Stock Market, Lo Otzer BeAdom (Doesn't Stop For Red Lights) was written about the 1982 Lebanon War. It also contained personal songs and love songs. This album was produced by Hanoch and Moshe Levi, who since then became his musical partner. Hanoch planned a tour in small halls, but eventually he decided to risk putting on four stadium shows.  In 1988 Hanoch created another album, "Rak Ben-Adam" (Only human) which wasn't very successful because it was partially made in England.

The 1990s
In 1991 Hanoch recorded his album BaGilgul Haze which was a big success. One of the songs, Kacha VeKacha, was written as a joke but was very successful.

In 1992 Hanoch released a collection of  songs, partially from a live show, called Lo Yechol Lishon Achshav (Can't Sleep Now). In 1994 he recorded A-Li-Mut (Violence); in 1997 he released Erev Erev (Evening Evening), which also included a few translated songs from his English album. In the same year he composed Shalom Haver (Goodbye Friend), in the memory of prime minister Yitzhak Rabin, for Einstein's album LeAn Parhu HaParparim. This was the first cooperation between Einstein and Hanoch after 17 years. The cooperation resulted in a joint album by Einstein and him – Muskat (1999).

New Millennium

In 2001 an independent label, "C90", produced a bootleg from Hanoch's White Wedding tour. The album, distributed in 20 numbered copies only under the name "Lavan Shel Hatuna", featured a recording of a concert that took place in "Hadar" theatre in Givataym in January 1982. In 2002, 25 years after the release of Adam Betoch Azmo, the album was reissued with a bonus song recorded in 2000 with David Broza. In 2003 Hanoch recorded Or Israeli with the rock band Monica Sex. Amongst the songs on the album, Ahavat Neuray, Hayom, Rosh Hamemshala and the album's theme song stood out and gained the most recognition.
In 2004 the Yetzia tour was released as a live album. At the end of that year, a five-disk collection was released summing up Shalom's career up to that point. In the summer of 2005 Hanoch joined Shlomo Artzi, and they went on a tour called Hitchabrut, which was very successful and was released as a double album and a DVD. Hanoch and Artzi wrote the song Ani RoE Otach especially for the tour.

Ever since 2005 Hanoch has been regularly performing at the Barby club in Tel Aviv with a show called "Hayot Layla" (Night Animals), a name that was given to it because of the late hours of the night in which it takes place. The show was documented and released on DVD in 2009.

In 2008 Hanoch guest starred as himself on the comedy show "Red Band" that deals with the Israeli music industry.

In 2009 Hanoch released the album "Shalom Hanoch", with music production done by Moshe Levi and Eyal Katzav. The singles that preceded the album were Ptuchim Leahava, the protest song Elohim and Omeret Li La'Ad.

In September 2009 Hanoch's song Mehakim LaMashiach won the title "Best Song Of All Time" on "Yedioth Ahronot"'s Rosh Hashana holiday paper, as rated by senior music industry personas.

The 2010s

In 2010 Shalom Hanoch launched a new concert named "Arba Tachanot" (Four Stations), taking a tour through stations in his entire career.  The first station was dedicated to the albums "Shablul", "Plastelina" and "Shalom"; The second one to "Adam Betoch Atzmo" and "Sof Onat Hatapuzim"; Third station focused on "Hatuna Levana" and "Al Pney HaAdmaa" and the fourth to "mechakim LaMashiach" and "Rak Ben Adam". These concerts were custom to feature surprise guests such as Ehud Banay, Berry Sakharof, Rita, Aviv Geffen, Tom & Orit Petrober (Hayehudim), Ninet Tayeb, Romi Hanoch, Assaf Amdursky, Dana Berger, Yizhar Ashdot and Keren Peles. The concerts were documented on a live concert album of 4 Cds, as well as on DVD.

Discography

References

External links

A voracious appetite for Hebrew music, Haaretz, Nissim Calderon
 

1946 births
Living people
Israeli composers
20th-century Israeli male singers
Israeli rock singers
21st-century Israeli male singers
Beit Zvi School for the Performing Arts alumni
Kibbutzniks
Israeli male singer-songwriters